Backbone Digital Leaders is a digital strategy firm that specializes in online advocacy, social networking, and constituency development. It was founded by communications expert Jess Moore Matthews and provided digital strategy services for Michelle Obama’s When We All Vote, and Stacey Abrams’ Fair Fight Action organizations advocating for fairness and against voter suppression in the United States.

History
Chirlane McCray hired Matthews as her digital director. From there, Matthews became chief content officer for New York City Mayor Bill de Blasio, and supported his presidential campaign as well as the presidential campaign of Senator Elizabeth Warren. Matthews founded Backbone as an organization of Black women and nonbinary activists that was established to support voting rights and training for digital activists.

Services
Backbone offers online digital strategy and training in social media marketing, micro-targeted advertising, email campaigns, grassroots fundraising, and multi-platform organizing. Advisors include Bree Newsome Bass, Erica Buddington, Maya Rupert, and Stacy Lynch.

External links 
 Backbone Digital Leaders - Company website

References

Black-owned companies of the United States